The 2002 Sparkassen Cup (tennis) was a women's tennis tournament played on indoor hard courts in Leipzig, Germany. It was part of the Tier II category of the 2002 WTA Tour. It was the 13th edition of the tournament and was held from 23 September until 29 September 2002. First-seeded Serena Williams won the singles title and earned $93,000 first-prize money.

Singles main draw entrants

Seeds

 1 Rankings are as of 16 September 2002.

Other entrants
The following players received wildcards into the singles main draw:
  Elke Clijsters
  Martina Müller
  Barbara Rittner

The following players received entry from the singles qualifying draw:

  Anca Barna
  Iveta Benešová
  Denisa Chládková
  Květa Hrdlickova

Doubles main draw entrants

Seeds

1 Rankings as of 16 September 2002.

Other entrants
The following pairs received wildcards into the doubles main draw:
  Anca Barna /  Vanessa Henke
  Alexandra Stevenson /  Serena Williams

Finals

Singles

  Serena Williams defeated  Anastasia Myskina, 6–3, 6–2

Doubles

  Alexandra Stevenson /  Serena Williams defeated  Janette Husárová /  Paola Suárez, 6–4, 6–4

External links
 ITF tournament edition details
 2002 Sparkassen Cup Draw

Sparkassen Cup
Sparkassen Cup (tennis)
German